Adenau is a Verbandsgemeinde ("collective municipality") in the district of Ahrweiler, in Rhineland-Palatinate, Germany. The seat of the municipality is in Adenau.

The Verbandsgemeinde Adenau consists of the following Ortsgemeinden ("local municipalities"):

* seat of the Verbandsgemeinde

References

Verbandsgemeinde in Rhineland-Palatinate